Wem may refer to:
HMS Wem (1919), a minesweeper of the Royal Navy during World War I
Weem, a village in Perthshire, Scotland
Wem, a small town in Shropshire, England
Wem (musician), hip hop musician

WEM may stand for:
 County Westmeath, Ireland, Chapman code
Watkins Electric Music, a British manufacturer of musical instruments
Wells Regional Transportation Center, a train station in Wells, Maine, United States, which uses the code WEM
West Edmonton Mall, Alberta, Canada
 World Energy Model, from the International Energy Agency